Wilfred Henry Fortune (9 October 1897 – 28 February 1961) was a New Zealand politician of the National Party.

Personal life
Fortune was born in 1897 in Paeroa. He received his education at Auckland Grammar School, the Auckland Teachers' Training College, and the University of Auckland. He obtained a B.A., a B.Com., and a diploma in social sciences. He initially worked as a teacher, then became a public secretary, and was then managing director of Young and Fortune Ltd. During World War II, he was a lieutenant colonel with the New Zealand Expeditionary Force (NZEF) in the Pacific. Fortune died on 28 February 1961.

Political career

In 1941 he won a seat on the Auckland City Council, serving two terms.

Member of parliament
He was a member of the Executive Council from 1949 to 1954 in the First National Government. In January 1950 he was appointed Minister of Police.

In 1955, Fortune was granted the use of the title of "Honourable" for life, having served more than three years as a member of the Executive Council.

After parliament
From 1956 until his death, he chaired the National Party in Auckland. In 1957 he won a by-election to regain a seat on the Auckland City Council. His interests lay in education and health, and he was a member of the Auckland Education Board, and the Seddon Memorial Technical College Board of Governors. He was a director of the YMCA, and chaired the Auckland Central Health Camp Council.

Notes

References

1897 births
1961 deaths
New Zealand National Party MPs
Members of the Cabinet of New Zealand
Members of the New Zealand House of Representatives
New Zealand MPs for Auckland electorates
People from Paeroa
People educated at Auckland Grammar School
University of Auckland alumni
New Zealand schoolteachers
New Zealand military personnel of World War II
Unsuccessful candidates in the 1954 New Zealand general election
Unsuccessful candidates in the 1943 New Zealand general election
Auckland City Councillors